Frozen – Live at the Hyperion was a musical stage show inspired by Disney's 2013 animated film Frozen. It was presented at the Hyperion Theater in Hollywood Land at Disney California Adventure. The show premiered on May 27, 2016 and had its last four performances on March 13, 2020; the theater then closed March 14.

A version of the show was premiered on board the Disney Cruise Line ship Disney Wonder under the name Frozen: A Musical Spectacular on November 10, 2016.

History
Frozen – Live at the Hyperion was announced on September 9, 2015, as a replacement for the venue's previous musical, Disney's Aladdin: A Musical Spectacular, which played from 2003 to 2016.

The production is directed by the Tony-nominated Liesl Tommy, written by the Tony-nominated Chad Beguelin, and features sets by the Tony-nominated scenic designer Robert Brill. Jason Michael Webb is the musical supervisor and arranger. Puppets for the show were designed by Michael Curry. About 3,500 people auditioned for the initial production, from which the production team selected a cast of over 100 to put on up to five performances daily.

Changes
As part of the transformation of the Hyperion Theater to accommodate Frozen – Live at the Hyperion, the stage was rebuilt. The new additions include a  LED video wall and large curtains on either side of the stage that serve as a projection surface. The production also includes a large number of mobile sets in addition to the video elements.

Some solo songs like "In Summer" were changed by Webb to ensemble numbers. Some scenes such as Wandering Oaken's Trading Post and Sauna and characters such as Marshmallow, the ice monster were removed. For the "Let It Go" sequence, Elsa stands on top of crystal stairs that rotate out over the crowd.

See also
For the First Time in Forever: A Frozen Sing-Along Celebration

References

External links

Frozen (franchise)
Amusement park attractions introduced in 2016
Amusement park attractions that closed in 2020
Walt Disney Parks and Resorts entertainment
Disney California Adventure
Disney Cruise Line
Hollywood Land
2016 musicals
Musicals based on animated films
Musicals based on works by Hans Christian Andersen
2016 establishments in California
2020 disestablishments in California